The Hindmarsh River is a river located in the Fleurieu Peninsula region in the Australian state of South Australia.

Course and features
The river descends  over its  course.

Etymology
The river is named in honour of Rear Admiral Sir John Hindmarsh , the first Governor of South Australia.

See also

 Rivers of South Australia
 Hindmarsh Valley Reservoir

References

Hindmarsh River
Fleurieu Peninsula